HD 91324 is a likely binary star system in the southern constellation of Vela. It is visible to the naked eye with an apparent visual magnitude of 4.89. It is moving further from the Earth with a heliocentric radial velocity of +21 km/s.

It is around 3.5 billion years old and is spinning with a projected rotational velocity of 9 km/s. The star has 1.18 times the mass of the Sun and 1.86 times the Sun's radius. It is radiating 4.55 times the Sun's luminosity from its photosphere at an effective temperature of 6,127 K.

A faint star designated 2MASS J10313234–5338010 was found to be a possible companion to HD 91324 through a proper motion study combining data from the Two Micron All-Sky Survey and the WISE space telescope. Proper motion measurements for the two stars are almost identical making HD 91324 a likely binary star system. The photometry of 2MASS J10313234–5338010 is consistent with it being a red dwarf of spectral type M5 or M6.

References

F-type main-sequence stars
Binary stars
High-proper-motion stars
Vela (constellation)
Durchmusterung objects
Gliese and GJ objects
091324
051523
4134